Diadegma crataegi is a wasp first described by Horstmann in 1980.
No subspecies are listed.

References

crataegi
Insects described in 1980